Marcel Coraș (born 14 May 1959) is a Romanian former professional footballer who played as a striker.

Career
He was born in Arad and debuted in Divizia A with hometown side UTA Arad in 1977. His most successful period was between 1983 and 1988, when he played for Sportul Studenţesc, with whom he won the league's silver medal in 1986. He became top goalscorer of the Divizia A in 1984 with 20 goals. He retired in 1995, having finished his fourth spell with FC UTA Arad.

Coraș got 36 caps and 6 goals for Romania, and represented his country at Euro 1984.

Honours

Club
Sportul Studenţesc
 Romanian League runner-up: 1985–86

Individual
 Divizia A Top Scorer: 1983–84
 European Silver Boot: 1988–89

References

External links
 

1959 births
Living people
Sportspeople from Arad, Romania
Romanian footballers
Association football forwards
Romania international footballers
UEFA Euro 1984 players
Liga I players
Liga II players
Super League Greece players
FC UTA Arad players
FC Politehnica Iași (1945) players
FC Sportul Studențesc București players
Panionios F.C. players
FC Universitatea Cluj players
Romanian expatriate footballers
Romanian expatriate sportspeople in Greece
Expatriate footballers in Greece
Romanian expatriate sportspeople in France
Expatriate footballers in France
Romanian football managers
FC UTA Arad managers
CS Minaur Baia Mare (football) managers
FC Bihor Oradea managers
CS ACU Arad managers